Bacouël is a commune in the Oise department in northern France. Breteuil-Embranchement station has rail connections to Amiens, Creil and Paris.

Population

See also
 Communes of the Oise department

References

Communes of Oise